Severino Poletto (18 March 1933 – 17 December 2022) was an Italian cardinal of the Catholic Church who served as Archbishop of Turin from 1999 to 2010. A bishop since 1980, he was made a cardinal by Pope John Paul II in 2001.

Biography
Poletto was born in Salgareda, Veneto, on 18 March 1933, the youngest of 11 children, 9 of whom survived infancy. The family emigrated to the Piedmont in search of work in 1952. He studied at the seminary in Treviso and then at the major seminary in Casale Monferrato in the province of Alessandria. He was ordained a priest on 29 June 1957 by Bishop Giuseppe Angrisani of Casale Monferrato. He earned a licentiate in moral theology summa cum laude from the Alphonsian Academy in Rome in 1977 and worked as a curate in Montemagno. In 1965 he was named parish priest in Oltreponte; at the same time he worked part-time in a local factory. In 1973, Poletto founded the Diocesan Centre for Family Ministry.

On 3 April 1980, he was named bishop coadjutor of the Diocese of Fossano. He was consecrated a bishop on 17 May by Cardinal Anastasio Ballestrero, Archbishop of Turin, and succeeded as bishop on 29 October.

Poletto served for ten years as secretary of the Piedmontese Episcopal Conference.

On 16 March 1989, he was named Bishop of Asti and on 19 June 1999 Archbishop of Turin. He was installed in Turin on 9 September.

Pope John Paul II created him Cardinal-Priest of San Giuseppe in Via Trionfale on 21 February 2001. On 15 May John Paul named him a member of the Congregation for the Clergy and on 18 May of the Prefecture for the Economic Affairs of the Holy See and the Pontifical Commission for the Cultural Heritage of the Church.

Poletto was one of the cardinal electors who participated in the 2005 papal conclave that elected Pope Benedict XVI and the 2013 conclave that elected Pope Francis.

Pope Benedict XVI accepted his resignation as Archbishop of Turin on 11 October 2010.

Poletto died in Moncalieri, just south of Turin, on 17 December 2022, at the age of 89.

References

External links

 
 

1933 births
2022 deaths
People from the Province of Treviso
Alphonsian Academy alumni
21st-century Italian cardinals
Bishops of Asti
Archbishops of Turin
20th-century Italian Roman Catholic archbishops
21st-century Italian Roman Catholic archbishops
Bishops appointed by Pope John Paul II
Cardinals created by Pope John Paul II
Pontifical Lateran University alumni